Clarence Henry "Kleggie" Hermsen (March 12, 1923 – March 2, 1994) was an American professional basketball player.

A 6-foot-9 center from the University of Minnesota, Hermsen began his professional career with the Sheboygan Red Skins of the National Basketball League in 1943–44 and 1945–46. He scored 11 points in 12 games during his rookie campaign, but played a greater role in his second season, scoring 55 points in 21 games. Both Red Skins teams advanced to the NBL championship series — losses to the Fort Wayne Zollner Pistons and Rochester Royals.

Hermsen then played six seasons (1946–1951; 1952–1953) in the Basketball Association of America and National Basketball Association as a member of the Cleveland Rebels, Toronto Huskies, Baltimore Bullets, Washington Capitols, Chicago Stags, Tri-Cities Blackhawks, Boston Celtics, and Indianapolis Olympians.  He averaged 9.3 points per game and 5.8 rebounds per game in his BAA/NBA career and won a league championship with the Bullets in 1948.

BAA/NBA career statistics

Regular season

Playoffs

External links

1923 births
1994 deaths
American expatriate basketball people in Canada
American men's basketball players
Baltimore Bullets (1944–1954) players
Basketball players from Minnesota
Boston Celtics players
Centers (basketball)
Chicago Stags players
Cleveland Rebels players
Indianapolis Olympians players
Minnesota Golden Gophers men's basketball players
People from Aitkin County, Minnesota
Power forwards (basketball)
Sheboygan Red Skins players
Toronto Huskies players
Tri-Cities Blackhawks players
Washington Capitols players